The Réseau Breton (RB) is a , standard gauge, and former , metre gauge, railway in Finistère, France, with a few kilometres of line in Côtes d'Armor, Ille-et-Vilaine and Morbihan. The hub of the system was Carhaix. The metre gauge lines were built with the capacity to be easily converted to standard gauge if necessary.

History

Background
Brittany in the mid nineteenth century was a largely agricultural area. the quarrying of slate and granite also took place. Forests in inland areas had previously supplied timber for construction of buildings and shipbuilding at the larger coastal ports, but this industry had largely declined as the source material was exhausted and the land turned over to agriculture. Apart from roads, the first transportation system constructed in Brittany was the Canal de Nantes à Brest, started in 1811 and completed in 1842. Although the canal could carry high volumes of freight, it was slow, relying on horse-drawn barges.

Railways
The first standard gauge railways in Brittany were the Chemin de fer de Paris à Orléans (CF PO) line from Paris to Quimper, which was completed in 1863 and the Chemins de fer de l'Ouest (CF de l'Ouest) line from Paris to Brest, which was completed in 1865. The CF PO built a line from Quimper to Châteaulin and Landerneau, where it connected with the CF PO. This line was completed in 1867. The CF PO built a line from Auray to  Pontivy, which was completed in 1864. In 1872, the CF de l'Ouest built a line from Saint Brieuc to Pontivy, where it connected with the CF PO line. These lines left central Brittany an area devoid of railways, and served only by the Canal de Nantes à Brest.

In 1880, the concession to build an Intérêt Générale system in Brittany was given to the CF de l'Ouest. It was agreed that the lines would be built to metre gauge, but provision would be made for conversion to standard gauge should the need arise. Morlaix would be the administrative headquarters, but Carhaix would be the main station, with engineering workshops, locomotive depôt and carriage workshops. The lines closed to passengers in 1939, but with the replacement buses being requisitioned at the outbreak of the Second World War the passenger service was resumed, with a couple of trips daily on each line. The RB saw an increase in freight traffic, being used to transport materials for the Atlantic Wall. After the war, passenger services were gradually withdrawn, and all metre gauge lines closed on 9 April 1967 with the section between Carhaix - Paimpol having been converted to dual gauge in 1924 and converted to standard gauge in 1953, and Carhaix - Guingamp, closed in February 1967 for conversion to standard gauge later in 1967, remaining open.

Lines

Metre gauge
The metre gauge lines of the RB were:-

Carhaix - Morlaix

The  line from Carhaix to Morlaix opened on 28 September 1891. Carhaix station was the headquarters of the RB. All five lines that made up the main RB system originated from Carhaix. The station is located to the east of the town. In common with many of the station on the RB, Carhaix was architecturally similar to may CF de l'Ouest stations.

The lines of the RB were mainly built with Moroccan labour. Many of the stations were not in the settlements they purported to serve. Often a double-barrelled name indicated that the station lay between two places. Leaving Carhaix, the railway shared the trackbed with the line to Guingamp until it curved to the left and crossed the D787 road. The first station was Plounézéval Halte,. Pouallaouen was the next station. The Ulne was crossed on a high stone arch bridge before Huelgoat-Locmaria was reached. The d'Argent was crossed by a steel bridge before Kervallon Halte was reached. Here, the line passed to the east of the Forêt Domaniale de St-Ambrose. Kermarzin  and Le Cloître-Lannéanou  stations were followed by the summit of the line (over ) before Ploungonven-Plourin  was reached.

At Morlaix the line was shared with the CF de l'Ouest's standard gauge dual gauge line between Paris and Brest. A dual gauge section of track was laid on the up line on the viaduct across the harbour. This was built by the CF de l'Ouest as part of their Paris - Brest line. The viaduct crossed the Chemins de fer armoricains (CFA) Morlaix - Plestin-les-Grèves line. A platform at Morlaix was shared with the standard gauge. A branch was opened on 12 February 1906 to serve the port at Morlaix. Freight traffic beyond Plougonver ceased from 25 September 1962. The line between Carhaix and Morlaix closed completely on 9 April 1967.

Carhaix - Paimpol

The  line from Carhaix to Guingamp opened on 24 September 1893, and was extended a further  to Paimpol on 14 August 1894. The line between Guingamp and Paimpol was converted to dual gauge in the early 1920s with the addition of a third rail for standard gauge traffic. The standard gauge line opened to traffic on 24 May 1924. When the extra rail was added, gangs started from each end of the line, laying the extra rail to the left as they were facing the line. They met near Lancerf, where an arrangement had to be arranged to allow the metre gauge track to switch sides. This was known as the Sauterelle, the term being a corruption of saut rail. The sauterelle had to be approached slowly. In 1953, the metre gauge rail was removed between Guingamp and Paimpol, the line operating as standard gauge since then. The metre gauge line between Carhaix and Guingamp closed on 14 February 1967, re-opening as a standard gauge line on 3 July 1967.

The first station is Carnoët-Locarn, the station being nowhere near either village. Le Plenity Halte is next. Although plans were made to upgrade this to station status and provide full facilities, these were not carried out. Callac is next, followed by Le Mais Halte. Plougonver and Pont Melvez stations are followed by Coat-Guégen Halte. Moustéru station is the last before Guingamp. At Guingamp there were loco sheds and facilities to service metre and standard gauge rolling stock. There is a connection with the standard gauge Paris - Brest line.

Guingamp station had a connection with the Chemin de fer des Côtes-du-Nord (CdN) Guingamp - Plouha and Guingamp - St. Nicolas du Pélem lines. Gourland station is next, followed by Trégonneau-Squiffec then Brélidy-Plouëc, which is nearer to La Belle Eglise than Brélidy or Plouëc de Trieux. Plouëc had a connection with the CdN Plouëc - Tréguier line. Leaving Brélidy-Plouec, the line heads for the Trieux. After leaving Pontrieux Halte, the Trieux is crossed by a six-arch viaduct before Pontrieux is reached. A branch here served the port. The Leff is crossed by a steel bridge on the approach to Frynadour. Lancherf and Plounez are next, before the terminus at Paimpol Station. A branch at Paimpol served the port. Next to the RB station was a CdN station which served the Paimpol - Tréguier and Paimpol - Plouha lines. The CdN line between Paimpol and Tréguier crossed the branch to the port on a flat crossing.

Carhaix - Rosporden

The  line from Carhaix to Rosporden opened on 2 August 1896. Leaving Carhaix, the N164 Angers - Brest road was crossed by a skew bridge. The railway crossed the Canal de Nantes à Brest before Port de Carhaix station was reached. On leaving Port de Carhaix, the D769 road was crossed. Motreff was the next station. Gourin station was also the terminus of the Chemins de fer du Morbihan (CM) line to Meslan, although there was no direct link here between the two networks. Kerbiquet was the next station, then Guiscriff, Scaër and Coatloc'h stations were followed by Kerneval Halte before Rosporden station was reached. Rosporden station had a connection with the standard gauge Chemin de fer de Paris à Orléans (CF PO) Savernay - Landerneau line and there was an end-on junction with the CFA Rosporden - Landivisiau line.

Carhaix - La Brohinière

Carhaix - Rostrenen opened on 15 May 1898. Rostrenen - St. Lubin-le-Vaublanc opened on 17 August 1904. St. Lubin-le-Vaublanc - Loudéac opened on 1 October 1904. Loudéac - La Brohinière opened on 12 August 1907. The line between Loudéac and La Brohinière closed to passengers in October 1953. The line closed entirely on 9 April 1967.

Leaving Carhaix, the line initially ran parallel to the Morlaix and Guingamp lines before climbing and heading east when the other two line curved away to the left. The line crossed the D20 road then followed the D49 road. Trébrivan - Le Moustoir Halte was the first stop, followed by Maël Carhaix. On leaving Maël Carhaix, the line followed the D23 road. La Croix Madelaine Halte was followed by Rostrenen. Rostrenen was the terminus of the CdN line from Saint-Nicolas-du-Pélem, the Cdn station was adjacent to the RB station. Plouguernével was the next station. The Blavet was crossed by a steel girder bridge before Gouarec station was reached. A branch was opened on 1 June 1912 serving the port at Gouarec.

Bon Repos Halte and Saint Gelven Halte were followed by Caurel. Here, the railway ran high above the Lac de Guerlédan. At Mûr de Bretagne, a branch served a quarry. The next stations were St Guen and St Caradec. Loudéac station was shared with the CF de l'Ouest, lying on that company's 
St Brieuc - Pontivy line. The CdN line from Plémy also terminated at Loudéac. Full facilities were provided here, the turntable being a dual gauge one, shared with the CF de l'Ouest.

Leaving Loudéac, the line crossed the standard gauge CF de l'Ouest line on the level. Ganland Halte was followed by La Chèze St Barnabé, Plémet La Prénassaye and St Lubin le Vaublanc stations. Le Carguier Halte was followed by Laurenan, Merdrignac and Trémorel stations. After Loscouet Halte, the CF de l'Ouest's La Brohinière - Ploërmel line was crossed on the level before St Meén station was reached. The RB then ran parallel to the CF de l'Ouest. Le Crouais Halte was followed by the terminus at La Brohinière, where there was a connection with the CF de l'Ouest's Paris - Brest line.

Carhaix - Camaret
Carhaix - Pleyben opened on 30 August 1904. Pleyben - Châteaulin Ville opened on 4 August 1906. Châteaulin Ville - Châteaulin Gare opened on 11 August 1907. Châteaulin Gare - Crozon-Morgat opened on 13 August 1923. Crozon-Morgat - Camaret and Le Fret opened on 14 June 1925. Châteaulin Gare station had a connection with the CF PO Savernay - Landerneau line. The line between Perros St. Fiacre and Le Fret closed to passengers in May 1946.

Between Carhaix and Port de Carhaix, the line ran parallel to the Carhaix - Rosporden line. This gave the impression of double track, but was operated as two separate single track lines. Leaving Port de Carhaix, the line crossed the D769 road and then followed the Canal du Nantes à Brest until St Hernin - Cléden Halte ) was reached. The canal was followed until Spézet-Landeleau station ), after which the Aulne was crossed by a long steel bridge. The railway the began its ascent of the Monts d'Arreé. Kerivarc'h Halte ) was followed by Châteauneuf du Faou ), where the RB station lay alongside the CA station, which was on the CA's Landivisiau - Rosporden line. Leaving Châteauneuf du Faou, Langelet Halte ) was followed by Lennon station ) before Pleyben ) was reached.

Saint Segal station ) was followed by Port Launay ), where the railway joined the Aulne, running along its east bank to Châteaulin Ville station ), which was shared with the CF PO. Châteaulin Ville was on the CF PO Quimper - Landernau line. Leaving Châteaulin Ville, the RB line crossed the Aulne on a curving eleven-arch viaduct before Châteaulin Embranchement station ) was reached. Here, the goods facilities were separated from the RB line by the standard gauge PO line.

Leaving Châteauneuf Embranchement, the D887 road was crossed by a high arch bridge. Kerhillac Halte ) was followed by Plomodiern-Ploéven station ). St Nicolas Pentrez station ) was followed by Argol Halte ) before Telgruc ) and Tal-ar-Groas ) stations were followed by Crozon-Morgat station ). The next station was Perros-St Fiacre ), which was the junction for the  ) branch to Le Fret) from Carhaix. The main line continued to Penfrat Halte ) before terminating at Camaret-sur-Mer) from Carhaix.

Standard gauge

Pont-l'Abbé – Saint-Guénolé
The line between Pont-l'Abbé and Saint-Guénolé, built to metre gauge, had been opened by the Chemins de fer départementaux du Finistère, and closed before the Second World War. In 1947 it was reopened as a standard-gauge line for freight traffic only, before finally closing in 1963.

Carhaix - Paimpol
The metre gauge line between Guingamp and Paimpol was converted to dual gauge in 1924. With the removal of the metre gauge third rail in 1953, the line became standard gauge only between Guingamp and Paimpol. The conversion of the metre gauge line to standard gauge between Carhaix and Guingamp was completed on 3 July 1967.

Wars
The RB was not much affected by the First World War, although some equipment was requisitioned.

During the Second World War, the line was sabotaged by the Resistance. These incidents are recorded:-
 28 January 1944 - a train derailed at Pontrieux.
 16 February 1944 - a locomotive and eight wagons derailed at Plouisy.
 1 March 1944 - a locomotive and seven wagons derailed at Plouisy.
 5 April 1944 - eight wagons derailed at Moustéru.
 During 1944, six locomotives and the bridge over the Aulne were damaged.

Accidents
The RB had no major accidents. The majority of accidents being collisions with road vehicles at level crossings.

Rolling stock

Metre gauge steam locomotives

In 1951, a 2-8-4 (number 284-03 ) built for Gelsa at the Schneider workshops in Le Creusot was tested on the RB, as was a 4-8-4 built by Batignolles-Châtillon, Nantes.

Metre gauge diesel locomotives
A British Thomson-Houston diesel locomotive was trialled on the RB, having previously been tested on the CF du Vivarais. Despite being given a more powerful engine, it was not a success.

Metre gauge railcars

 M1 De Dion-Bouton NR series, built 1936. Capacity 42 passengers. Originally fitted with a  CLM engine, later replaced by a  Willème engine. To CFBS in 1940.
 M1 De Dion-Bouton NJ series with  Unic engine. Capacity 32 passengers. Ex SE Valmondois-Marines.
 M2 De Dion-Bouton NJ series with  Unic engine. Capacity 32 passengers. Ex SE Valmondois-Marines.
 M3 De Dion-Bouton NJ series with  Unic engine. Capacity 32 passengers. Ex SE Valmondois-Marines.
 R3 Billard A-150-D series with engine removed, used as a trailer. Built 1937, capacity 34 passengers.
 R4 Billard A-150-D series with engine removed, used as a trailer. Built 1937, capacity 34 passengers.
 R5 Billard A-150-D series with engine removed, used as a trailer. Built 1947, capacity 34 passengers. Preserved by VF du Velay.
 R6 Billard A-150-D series with engine removed, used as a trailer. Built 1947, capacity 34 passengers. Preserved by CFBS.
 R7 Billard A-150-D series with engine removed, used as a trailer. Built 1947, capacity 34 passengers. 
 R8 Billard A-150-D series with engine removed, used as a trailer. Built 1947, capacity 34 passengers. 
 R9 Billard A-150-D series with engine removed, used as a trailer. Built 1947, capacity 34 passengers. 
 X151 Billard A-150-D series. One of R3-R9 with engine replaced.
 X152 Billard A-150-D series. One of R3-R9 with engine replaced. Preserved by VF du Velay.
 X153 Billard A-150-D series. One of R3-R9 with engine replaced. Preserved by VF du Velay.
 X157 De Dion-Bouton OC1 series. Ex CdN. Capacity 50 passengers. Preserved at CFBS.
 X158 De Dion-Bouton OC1 series. Ex CdN. Capacity 50 passengers. To CFBS, then Chemins de fer de Corse, preserved by ACFCdN, Langueux.
 X201 De Dion-Bouton OC2 series with  Willème engine. Delivered 1946. Capacity 59 passengers. Transferred to CF Blanc-Argent in 1967.
 X202 De Dion-Bouton OC2 series with  Willème engine. Delivered 1946. Capacity 59 passengers. Transferred to CF Blanc-Argent in 1967. Preserved by the Association des Chemins de Fer de Côtes du Nord at Langueux.
 X203 De Dion-Bouton OC2 series with  Willème engine. Delivered 1946. Capacity 59 passengers. Transferred to CF Blanc-Argent in 1967.
 X204 De Dion-Bouton OC2 series with  Willème engine. Delivered 1946. Capacity 59 passengers. Transferred to CF Blanc-Argent in 1967.
 X205 De Dion-Bouton OC2 series with  Willème engine. Delivered 1946. Capacity 59 passengers. Transferred to CF Blanc-Argent in 1967.Preserved by the train touristique de Bas-Berry.
 X206 De Dion-Bouton OC2 series with  Willème engine. Delivered 1946. Capacity 59 passengers. Transferred to CF Blanc-Argent in 1967. Preserved by the train touristique de Bas-Berry.
 X231 Decauville LJK series with two  Saurer engines. Capacity 52 passengers. Built 1940, intended for export to French Indo-China but not delivered owing to the war, to RB in 1951.
 X232 Decauville LJK series with two  Saurer engines. Capacity 52 passengers. Built 1940, intended for export to French Indo-China but not delivered owing to the war, to RB in 1951. Preserved by Musée des Tramways à Vapeur et des Chemins de Fer Secondaires France (MTVS), Butry-sur-Oise.
 X233 Decauville LJK series with two  Saurer engines. Capacity 52 passengers. Built 1940, intended for export to French Indo-China but not delivered owing to the war, to RB in 1951. In store at Tence for future use on Voies Ferrées du Velay.

In 1948, a Renault railcar with a  engine that had been destined for French Indo-China was tested on the RB for six months before being exported to Cameroon. In 1951, two Floirat railcars were tested on the RB before being exported.

Metre gauge passenger stock
The RB had the following passenger stock:-

 Five composite carriages built by De Dietrich in 1891, numbered ABCDf1-5. Capacity 5 first, 9 second and 22 third class passengers.
 Six composite carriages built by De Dietrich in 1892, numbered ABCDf6-11. Capacity 5 first, 9 second and 22 third class passengers.
 Four composite carriages built by De Dietrich in 1893, numbered ABCDf12-15. Capacity 5 first, 9 second and 22 third class passengers.
 Four composite carriages built by De Dietrich in 1895, numbered ABDf51-54. Capacity 7 first and 19 second class passengers.
 Four composite carriages built by Carel, Fouché et Compagnie, Le Mans in 1903, numbered ABDf55-60. Capacity 7 first and 19 second class passengers.
 Five composite carriages built by Carel, Fouché et Compagnie, Le Mans in 1909, numbered ABDf61-65. Capacity 7 first and 19 second class passengers.
 Four composite carriages built by De Dietrich in 1897, numbered ABf81-84. Capacity 15 first and 21 second class passengers.
 Two composite carriages built by De Dietrich in 1899, numbered ABf85-86. Capacity 15 first and 21 second class passengers.
 One composite carriage built by Carel, Fouché et Compagnie, Le Mans in 1903, numbered ABf87. Capacity 18 first and 24 second class passengers.
 Four composite carriages built by Carel, Fouché et Compagnie, Le Mans in 1909, numbered ABDfy88-91. Capacity 14 first and 21 second class passengers.
 Five third class carriages built by De Dietrich in 1891, numbered Cf101-105. Capacity 58 passengers. Cf101 preserved by MTVS.
 Six third class carriages built by De Dietrich in 1892, numbered Cf106-111. Capacity 58 passengers.
 Four third class carriages built by De Dietrich in 1895, numbered Cf112-115. Capacity 58 passengers.
 Four third class carriages built by De Dietrich in 1899, numbered Cf116-119. Capacity 58 passengers.
 Ten third class carriages built by Carel, Fouché et Compagnie, Le Mans in 1903, numbered Cf120-129. Capacity 58 passengers.
 Ten third class carriages built by Carel, Fouché et Compagnie, Le Mansin 1905, numbered Cf130-139. Capacity 58 passengers.
 One composite carriage built by De Dietrich in 1899, numbered ABfy1000.

Preservation
Some twenty vehicles survive, including twelve on the Chemin de fer du Vivarais and four on the CF du Velay.

Metre gauge freight stock
 35 Fourgons numbered Df201-235.
 296 vans, numbered K301-596. K539 preserved by MTVS.
 147 vans, numbered Kf1451-1598. Three vans preserved by MTVS, numbered KF1374, Kf1457 and Kf1467.
 168 open wagons, numbered UL501-668.
 85 open wagons, numbered ULf1651-1736
 51 bolster flats, numbered QMo951-952.
 105 Plats à bord rabattant, numbered HM701-805
 42 Plats à bord rabattant, numbered HMf1851-1893.
 1 tank wagon, ex Df220, numbered SC10.
 15 Plats à bogies, numbered HMy2001-2016.

Vehicles with a "f" in their numbers were equipped with a vacuum brake. Non braked vehicles were through piped.

Preservation
Some twenty vehicles have been preserved, mostly vans. They can be found on the CF Blanc-Argent, CFBS, ACFCdN and MTVS.

Metre gauge departmental stock

 1 rail mounted crane, numbered S3001.
 1 crane runner, ex HM713, numbered S3002.
 1 crew carriage, ex ABDf8, numbered S3003.
 1 tool van, ex Kf 1460, numbered S3004.
 1 flat wagon, ex HMf1856, numbered S3005.
 1 workshop van, ex K464, numbered S3006.
 1 van for calibrating scales, ex Kf1588, numbered S3007.
 2 weedkiller tanks, ex QMo949, numbered S3008 and ex ABCDf13, numbered S3012.
 1 tank agon, ex K530, numbered S3009.
 1 Dormitory carriage, ex ABf86, numbered S3011.
 2 bogie flats, numbered HMfy2021-2022.
 2 carriages leased out, ex ABf87, numbered S3013 and ex Cf115, numbered S3014.
 16 inspection cars built by Billard, numbered 1-16. No. 1 was converted to standard gauge and renumbered 101.
 1 inspection car ex Réseau d'Anjou. Acquired in 1947 and converted to standard gauge, numbered 102.
 2 inspection cars, ex Réseau d'Anjou and CF Valmondois-Marines. Numbered 17–18.

Preservation
Six of the inspection cars have been preserved, including No.3 on the CF Blonay-Camay and No. 6 on the CF Touristique d'Ardèche.

Standard gauge steam locomotives
The first RB standard gauge locomotive was an 0-6-0 built in the 1860s for the CF de l'Ouest. Several were in use until the end of the Second World War. There were also five 0-10-0T locomotives ex Saxony Railways class XI, built by Hartman between 1913 and 1918. In 1939, some 2-6-2T locomotives were acquired. They were in service until 1953. After the war, some 2-8-0 locomotives by Baldwin and Alco were acquired. In 1956, some 4-6-0 locomotive are acquired from the CF PO, and in 1958, some 2-8-2 locomotives by Fives-Lille are leased. These are used until the end of steam in 1971.

Standard gauge railcars
 Two Renault TE series railcars acquired in 1954.
 Two Renault AEK series railcars acquired in 1959.
 XAB4051 Renault VH series railcar built in 1960, acquired in 1967.
 Two Renault U150 series railcars acquired in 1970.
 Two Renault U300 series railcars acquired in 1972.
 X233 Decauville U600 series railcar acquired in 1982.
 One ANF 2100 series railcar acquired in 1987.
 X97151 Soulé A2E railcar built 1990, with  engines, seating 50 passengers.
 X97152 Soulé A2E railcar built 1990, with  engines, seating 50 passengers.
 X97153 Soulé A2E railcar built 1990, with  engines, seating 50 passengers.

Standard gauge diesel locomotives
 BB4817
 Moyse diesel locomotive.

Standard gauge departmental stock
 101 Billard inspection car.
 102 Billard inspection car.

References

This article has been compiled with information translated from the French article on the RB.

External links
Photos of current RB rolling stock
Rail Bretagne A site for all railways in Brittany, forums have photos of old postcards of the line.

Bibliography

Buildings and structures in Finistère
Côtes-d'Armor
Ille-et-Vilaine
Morbihan
Metre gauge railways in France
Railway companies of France
Transport in Brittany
Dual gauge railways